Pavlovsky Guard Regiment was a Russian Imperial Guard infantry regiment. It was formed out of 2 battalions of the Moscow Grenadiers in November 19, 1796. They were given the title of Pavlovsky Life-Guard on April 13, 1813 for their deeds during the 1812 Patriotic war.

History

1796-1813 
The Pavlovsky Grenadiers were formed from 2 detached battalions of the Moscow Grenadiers in November 19, 1796. The basis of their formation was the 77th Tengisky infantry regiment who possessed a similar uniform. They were sent as part of the expedition to Holland in 1799. They were sent to Hanover as part of the Hanover Expedition in 1805 and participated in the War of the Fourth Coalition as well. They're noted to have taken part in battles such as Battle of Czarnowo, where they repulsed the 2nd French attack and under the command of Major Palibin and Lieutenant Colonel Lokhov recaptured a height on the Russian left, dislodging the French in hand-to-hand fighting and recapturing a light battery. The battle of Czarnowo is also where the regiment is known to have distinguished themselves in the fighting.

Their participation in the Battle of Eylau included flanking the French under Major Makhov and Captain Panov, utilising a battalion and 2 companies respectively. They turned back a cavalry charge from Murat's horsemen and captured multiple prisoners, and went on to repulse attacks from Moran, Saint-Illaire and Gudin's divisions.

With the regiment's battalions effectively dispersed across the 3rd Infantry corps under Tuchkov's 1st Western Army and the 32nd infantry division, they fought in numerous battles.

The Battle of Klyastitsy is among their distinguishing moments. Under Captain Kyrlov led the 2nd battalion to pursue the dislodged French, who had set fire to the only bridge across the Nischu. They stormed the bridge regardless and continued a pursuit of the French infantry, routing them off the field at bayonet point.

Their contributions to the Battle of Borodino were made in the fight against V Corps (Grande Armée), initially repulsing them from the Utitska village and heavily damaging a French column in the fighting.

On the day of April 13, 1813, they were given the title of Pavlovsky Life-Guard for the courage rendered in the Patriotic war.

Campaigns 
1799–1813
Napoleonic Wars
1828–1829
Russo-Turkish War
1831
Polish campaign
1863–1864
Polish campaign
1877–1878
Russo-Turkish War
1914–1917
First World War

Commanders 
 Dmitry Neverovsky
 Richard Troyanovich Meves

Memorials 
Memorial to the Pavlovsky regiment at Borodino's fields.

References

Sources 
 Gorokhoff, Gerard. Russian Imperial Guard. 2002.
 Handbook of the Russian Army 1914 by the British General Staff. Battery Press reprint edition, 1996.
 Govault O.X. History of the Life-Guard Pavlovsky Regiment. 1852.

Russian Imperial Guard
Infantry regiments of the Russian Empire
Saint Petersburg Governorate
Guards regiments of the Russian Empire